Palaquium luzoniense, also called red nato, is a species of plant in the family Sapotaceae. It is endemic to the Philippines. It is threatened by habitat loss.

References

luzoniense
Flora of the Philippines
Taxonomy articles created by Polbot
Plants described in 1880
Taxa named by Celestino Fernández-Villar